Hočevar is a Slovenian surname. Notable people with the surname include:

Andrej Hočevar (born 1984), Slovenian ice hockey goaltender
Franc Hočevar (1853-1919), Austrian–Slovenian mathematician
Matej Hočevar (born 1982), Slovenian ice hockey player
Simon Hočevar (born 1974), Slovenian slalom canoer
Stanislav Hočevar (born 1944), Roman Catholic archbishop of Belgrade
Toussaint Hočevar (1927-1987), Slovenian American economic historian
Tone Hočevar (born 1951), Yugoslav slalom canoer
Zoran Hočevar (born 1944), Slovenian writer

See also 
Brittany Hochevar (born 1981), American volleyball and beach volleyball player
Carson Hocevar (born 2003), American professional dirt track and stock car racing driver
Luke Hochevar (born 1983), American baseball player
Marcos Hocevar (born 1955), Brazilian tennis player
Ricardo Hocevar (born 1985), Brazilian tennis player
Sam Hocevar (born 1978), French software developer

Slovene-language surnames